Lieutenant-general Edward Bligh (19 September 1769 – 2 November 1840), styled The Honourable from birth, was a British Army officer, a member of the Irish House of Commons, a noted amateur cricketer and a prominent early member of Marylebone Cricket Club. He was a member of the Darnley noble family.

Early life
Bligh was born in 1769 in County Meath in the Kingdom of Ireland, the second son of John Bligh, 3rd Earl of Darnley and his wife Lady Mary (née Stoyte). His mother was a "wealthy heiress" and the only child of a leading Irish barrister, John Stoyte from Streete, County Westmeath. John Bligh, who was 47 years old, married the 18 year old Stoyte in 1767 in Dublin. The Earls of Darnley owned Clifton Lodge in County Meath and much of the area around Athboy in the county, as well as Cobham Hall in Kent, England, and Edward Bligh grew up at both properties. He was educated at Eton College.

Army career
After leaving Eton, Bligh entered the British Army, initially being commissioned into the Coldstream Guards as an ensign in 1787. He was promoted to major, serving in the 3rd Foot Guards, in 1792 and, after serving in the 1793 Flanders campaign during the early years of the French Revolutionary Wars held the rank of lieutenant-colonel in the 85th Regiment of Foot by 1794 and brevet colonel by 1798, when he served as aide-de-camp to George III whilst serving in the 107th Regiment of Foot. He commanded the 2nd battalion of the 5th Regiment of Foot between 1799 and 1803 and late commanded the 33rd Regiment of Foot. In 1805, Bligh was promoted to major-general at the age of 32. Bligh was promoted to lieutenant-general in 1811.

Cricket
Primarily a batsman, Bligh played in 76 first-class cricket matches in a career which lasted from 1789 to 1813. He was a prominent member of the MCC and played 27 of his first-class matches for the club, as well as a number of matches for sides the club was linked to. He appeared 14 times for England sides and eight times for Kent sides between 1790 and 1806 as well as for the Gentlemen of Kent. He organised his own side, E Bligh's XI, and played for one organised by his brother John Bligh, 4th Earl of Darnley.

The brothers opened the batting for Kent against a Hampshire side in 1790 and both played regularly in first-class matches. Arthur Haygarth describes Edward Bligh as "one of the best gentlemen bats of his day", and he scored a total of 1,311 runs in first-class matches. In lower-level cricket he scored two centuries, both for MCC sides, making 132 against the Bullingdon Club at Oxford in 1796 and 105 against a Middlesex side at Lord's Old Ground in 1797. In 1806 he played for the Gnetlemen against the Players in the first two matches between the sides.

Family and later life
Bligh represented Athboy in the Irish House of Commons in 1800. The constituency was disfranchised at the end of the year as a result of the Acts of Union 1800 at which the Irish House of Commons was combined with that of Great Britain to form the Parliament of the United Kingdom of Great Britain and Ireland. His great-grandfather Thomas Bligh, grandfather John Bligh, 1st Earl of Darnley and father all held the seat, the family owning the land around the town. His great-uncle, also Thomas Bligh, held the seat between 1761 and 1775 and his second cousin Thomas Cherburgh Bligh held it between 1783 and 1800, serving alongside Bligh in the final parliament. He served alongside his nephew Edward Bligh, 5th Earl of Darnley as one of the Governors of Meath in 1831.

The younger brother of John Bligh, 4th Earl of Darnley (1767–1831), who also played cricket for Kent, Bligh did not marry. His nephew John Duncan Bligh played one first-class cricket match for an MCC side in 1822, and his great-nephews Edward Vesey Bligh, John Bligh, 6th Earl of Darnley and Henry Bligh all played for the Gentlemen of Kent, with Edward and Henry both also playing for Kent County Cricket Club. More distant relations to have played for Kent sides were Lodovick Bligh and Ivo Bligh, 8th Earl of Darnley who captained the English cricket team in Australia in 1882–83 and was presented with the original Ashes urn. Another member of the family, Algernon Bligh, played first-class cricket for Somerset County Cricket Club.

Bligh died at Thames Ditton in Surrey in 1840. He was 71.

Notes

References

External links

1769 births
1840 deaths
Edward
33rd Regiment of Foot officers
British Army lieutenant generals
English cricketers of 1787 to 1825
Gentlemen cricketers
Irish MPs 1798–1800
Members of the Parliament of Ireland (pre-1801) for County Meath constituencies
Marylebone Cricket Club cricketers
People educated at Eton College
People from County Meath
Younger sons of earls
Irish cricketers
Kent cricketers
Hampshire cricketers
Middlesex cricketers
Surrey cricketers
Old Etonians cricketers
Non-international England cricketers
R. Leigh's XI cricketers
Colonel C. Lennox's XI cricketers
Gentlemen of Kent cricketers
T. Mellish's XI cricketers
Hampshire and Marylebone Cricket Club cricketers
Military personnel from County Meath